The acronym TMSC might refer to:
 Toshiba Medical Systems Corporation
 Talcott Mountain Science Center
 the pin Test Serial Data of the JTAG debug interface